Kai Pearce-Paul (born 19 February 2001) is an English professional rugby league footballer who plays as a  forward or  for the Wigan Warriors in the Super League and England at international level.

Background
Pearce-Paul played his amateur rugby league for the Croydon Hurricanes.
Pearce-Paul is of English, Faroese, St Vincent and Antiguan descent. He is the younger brother of former London Broncos and London Skolars player Kam Pearce-Paul and older brother of Saracens senior academy player Kaden Pearce-Paul.

Career

2020
Pearce-Paul made his Super League debut in round 14 of the 2020 Super League season for the Warriors against St Helens where Wigan went on to lose 42–0 against a much more experienced St Helens squad, Pearce-Paul started from the bench and became Wigan Warriors player #1109.

2021
Pearce-Paul played 18 superleague matches in the 2021 season. He was Wigan Warrior’s top offloader. He debuted for England Knights against Jamaica.

2022
Pearce-Paul played 18 games for Wigan in the 2022 Super League season including the clubs shock semi-final loss against Leeds.

Pearce-Paul was later selected for England's 2021 Rugby League World Cup campaign and made his debut against Greece scoring a try in a 94-4 victory.

In December, it was announced that Pearce-Paul had signed a two-year contract with the Newcastle Knights in the NRL, starting in 2024.

References

External links

Wigan Warriors profile
England profile

2001 births
Living people
England Knights national rugby league team players
England national rugby league team players
English rugby league players
Rugby league players from Greater London
Rugby league second-rows
Wigan Warriors